Wilhite is a surname. Notable people with the surname include:

 Ingrid Wilhite (1959-2008), American filmmaker
 Irv J. Wilhite (1920–2020), American politician
 Jonathan Wilhite (born 1984), American football cornerback
 Mary Holloway Wilhite (1831–1892), American physician and philanthropist
 Sarah Wilhite Parsons (born 1995), American volleyball player
 Steve Wilhite (1948–2022), American computer scientist